Luis Enrique Terrero Garcia (born May 18, 1980) is a former  Major League Baseball outfielder who is currently a free agent. Terrero debuted with the Arizona Diamondbacks in 2003 and remained with the team until 2005. He has also played for the Baltimore Orioles in 2006 and the Chicago White Sox in 2007. In his first game for the White Sox, Terrero hit a home run. Terrero is one of the most recent victims of the hidden ball trick; he fell for the trick on August 10, 2005 during a game against the Florida Marlins.

On October 3, 2007, the Chicago White Sox outrighted Terrero to the minor leagues. However, he declined the assignment and became a free agent. Terrero returned to the Baltimore Orioles organization after signing a minor league contract before the  season.

He won the MVP award during the 2011 Mexican League season while playing with the Diablos Rojos del México.

Signed a 2012 Minor league contract with Colorado Rockies November and was released from his minor league contract on December 9, 2011.

Terrero signed with the Joplin Blasters of the American Association of Independent Professional Baseball for the 2016 season.

References

External links

1980 births
Águilas Cibaeñas players
Arizona Diamondbacks players
Azucareros del Este players
Baltimore Orioles players
Broncos de Reynosa players
Cañeros de Los Mochis players
Carolina Mudcats players
Charlotte Knights players
Chicago White Sox players
Diablos Rojos del México players
Dominican Republic expatriate baseball players in Canada
Dominican Republic expatriate baseball players in Japan
Dominican Republic expatriate baseball players in Mexico
Dominican Republic expatriate baseball players in the United States
El Paso Diablos players
High Desert Mavericks players
Kansas City T-Bones players
Lancaster JetHawks players

Leones del Escogido players
Living people
Louisville Bats players
Major League Baseball players from the Dominican Republic
Major League Baseball center fielders
Mexican League baseball center fielders
Mexican League baseball right fielders
Mexican League Most Valuable Player Award winners
Missoula Osprey players
Nippon Professional Baseball outfielders
Norfolk Tides players
Ottawa Lynx players
Piratas de Campeche players
Saraperos de Saltillo players
Senadores de San Juan players
Dominican Republic expatriate baseball players in Puerto Rico
South Bend Silver Hawks players
Tigres del Licey players
Tohoku Rakuten Golden Eagles players
Tucson Sidewinders players
Vaqueros Laguna players
Yakima Bears players
Yaquis de Obregón players